The Federal Columbia River Power System (FCRPS) is a series of multi-purpose, hydroelectric facilities in the Pacific Northwest region of the United States, constructed and operated by the U.S. Army Corps of Engineers and the U.S. Bureau of Reclamation, and a transmission system built and operated by the Bonneville Power Administration (BPA) to market and deliver electric power. The program is currently funded by the BPA's power and transmission rates.

Columbia River
Electric power companies of the United States
Hydroelectric power companies of the United States